Ramón Landeros González (born 6 April 1963) is a Mexican politician affiliated with the National Action Party. As of 2014 he served as Deputy of the LX Legislature of the Mexican Congress representing Guanajuato.

References

1963 births
Living people
Politicians from Guanajuato
National Action Party (Mexico) politicians
21st-century Mexican politicians
Deputies of the LX Legislature of Mexico
Members of the Chamber of Deputies (Mexico) for Guanajuato